Charlie Floyd (born in Aynor, South Carolina) is an American country music singer. Floyd performed in his native South Carolina for several years, and opened a nightclub called Charlie's Nite Life in Myrtle Beach, South Carolina. In 1993, he signed to Liberty Records and released his debut album, also titled Charlie's Nite Life. Alanna Nash of Entertainment Weekly gave Floyd's album a B rating, saying that Floyd had "the gruff voice of a '70s Southern rocker but his songs belie his tough-guy sound." The album produced two chart singles in "I've Fallen in Love (And I Can't Get Up)" and "Good Girls Go to Heaven". After the album's release, Floyd closed the nightclub, but reopened it in 1998.

Discography

Albums

Singles

Music videos

References

American country singer-songwriters
American male singer-songwriters
Liberty Records artists
Living people
People from Aynor, South Carolina
Country musicians from South Carolina
Year of birth missing (living people)
Singer-songwriters from South Carolina